The Erie Kats are 14 teams representing Erie Community College in intercollegiate athletics, including men and women's basketball, bowling, soccer, and swimming & diving. Men's sports include baseball, football, and ice hockey. Women's sports include volleyball, lacrosse, and softball. The Kats compete in the NJCAA and are members of the Region III Western New York Athletic Conference for most sports, except for the football team, which competes in the Northeast JC Football Conference.

Teams

Baseball
ECC has had 5 Major League Baseball Draft selections since the draft began in 1965.

References

External links
 

College sports in New York (state)
Sports in Buffalo, New York
Athletics